This article details the 2006 Super League season results. Twelve teams competed in the 11th season of British Summer-era rugby league. In all, 174 matches were played over nine months, from February 2006 to October.

Regular season

Round 1

Round 2

Round 3

Round 4

Round 5

Round 6

Round 7

Round 8

Round 9

Round 10

Round 11

Round 12

Round 13

Round 14

Round 15

Round 16

Round 17

Round 18 

 Bradford's home ground, Odsal, was renamed to 'Grattan Stadium' before this round for sponsorship reasons.
 The week prior to this round saw the shock move of Stuart Fielden from the Bradford Bulls to Wigan for a Super League record fee of £450,000. Despite a 30-12 home win over Warrington they remain bottom of the league after round 18.

Round 19 
 Following round 19, the bottom half of the league table was now very close, with 6 teams able to reach the play-offs and 5 still at risk of relegation.

Round 20 
 Wigan left the bottom of the table for the first time in three months but were still in the relegation position as Les Catalans were exempt from relegation. Warrington ended their bad run of results by beating Huddersfield.

Round 21 
 Wigan climbed out of the relegation zone after beating Salford - their fifth consecutive win. Wakefield had a chance to put Wigan back in the drop zone but blew a 20-0 lead against Huddersfield to allow the Giants to record a crucial victory.
 Hull's Richard Horne became the first player in 91 years to score tries in 11 straight games for the club in their victory over Warrington.

Round 22 
 Hull's 13 match winning streak came to an end at Harlequins but 2nd place rivals Leeds lost to leaders St Helens, who had Jamie Lyon sent off. Wigan's recent revival was halted by Warrington.

Round 23 
 Wakefield re-ignited the relegation battle with a win against local rivals Castleford, despite being reduced to 11 men by the end of the game.
 Leeds lost the battle for second place, and their third league match in a row.

Round 24

Round 25 
 St Helens rested a number of senior players for the trip to Perpignan ahead of the Challenge Cup Final. Despite this, their young side were only beaten by a Stacey Jones try 30 seconds from full-time.

Round 26 
 St. Helens returned to full strength having won the Challenge Cup in the week between rounds 25 and 26.

Round 27 
 The relegation battle will go down to the wire as Wakefield beat Bradford while Castleford lost to Salford. Wakefield meet Castleford next week for what could be a relegation decider.
 St Helens receive the League Leaders' Shield for a second successive year as recognition for finishing top of the competition league table for the regular season.
 Harlequins secure survival after beating Wigan.
 Salford secure a top-6 play-off spot for the first time in their history.
 Warrington secure the last play-off spot, but can still over-haul Salford for fifth place.

Round 28 
 Castleford were relegated as a consequence of their 29-17 defeat away to Wakefield.

Play-offs 

Like all Super League seasons since 1998, the 2006 championship was decided via a play-off series. Teams were introduced according to the play-off's format and their relative places in the league table at the end of all 28 regular rounds. The play-offs had no bearing on the minor premiership (otherwise known as the League Leaders' Shield).

Format 

Super League XI followed the top-six play-off system, for its fifth consecutive year. Places were granted to the top six teams in the Super League XI table. Following the final round of matches on the weekend of 15–17 September, all six play-off teams were set (in order of finishing place):

Notes

Home field advantage was given by position in the league table at the end of regular rounds, with the lower team playing on the team's ground. The only exception to this rule was the grand final, which was played at Old Trafford following tradition. The format followed the double elimination rule for the first and second placed teams, meaning whichever of the teams lost their qualifying play-off match would have to lose again in order to be knocked-out of the play-offs entirely.

Bracket

Details

References 

Results